The 2015 South African Hip Hop Awards were held at The Lyric Theatre, Gold Reef City Casino in Johannesburg, Gauteng Province. This marked the ceremony's 4th anniversary.

The nominees were announced on 30 October 2015. Riky Rick lead with 8 nominations, followed by AKA with 7 nominations. AKA won the "Most Valuable" award for the 4th time in a row, making him the only artist to ever win this award, and therefore currently holds the winning streak. AKA won the most awards: Best Collaboration, Most Valuable, Video of the Year and Best Digital Sales. AKA makes an appearance in six categories, and lost in one category Song of the Year to newcomer and mentee Emtee for his major debut single "Roll Up". At the age of 18 at the time of the ceremony, Nasty C was the youngest recipient of an award, namely the Best Freshman Award. All winners were announced at the ceremony on 9 December 2015. The ceremony was first aired on 31 December on South African Broadcast television channel e.TV.

Nominations and Winners 
The following is a list of nominees. The winners were initially announced on 9 December 2015 at the ceremony.

See also
 South African Hip Hop Awards

References

External links 
 Official Website

2015 music awards
2015 awards